The Ministry of National Unity and Citizenship  is a Guinean ministry created October 5, 2012 whose latest officeholder was  Djalikatou Diallo.

Officeholders since 2012

References 

Politics of Guinea
Government ministries of Guinea